Aluísio Francisco da Luz (1 March 1931 – 19 April 2020), simply known as Índio, was a Brazilian footballer. He was born in Cabedelo, Paraíba.

A striker, Índio won the Rio State Championship title with Flamengo in 1953, 1954 and 1955. He also played for the Brazil national football team at the 1954 FIFA World Cup finals.
Índio was the last surviving member of Brazil's 1954 World Cup squad.

Club career
Índio was one of the main strikers of CR Flamengo in his era. He played for almost eight years in the club and his average goal was one goal every two matches, having managed to enter the select list of top 10 scorers in the history of the club. In the Gávea team, he debuted in a match against São Paulo FC, replacing the great Durval.

Then he went on a tour in Europe with Flamengo from which returned undefeated. In 1952 he made history by interrupting a CR Vasco da Gama unbeaten series, and started to make his way to Flamengo second state championship in 1953, 1954 and 1955. Índio was still Flamengo's top scorer in the seasons of 1953 and 1956, with 41 and 31 goals respectively.

International career
For Brazil, he participated in  World Cup 1954 and 1957 South American Championship. He played 10 games and 5 goals with the hopscotch. For the Brazilian national team, his most important goal was against Peru, in the 1958 FIFA World Cup qualification. The game was 1–1 in Lima, and on the return Brazil won 1–0 with a "dry leaf" by Didi.

Honours
 Rio State Championship 1953, 1954, 1955
 1954 FIFA World Cup - Quarter-finals

References

External links
 La Liga stats
 

1931 births
2020 deaths
Brazilian footballers
Association football forwards
CR Flamengo footballers
Sport Club Corinthians Paulista players
RCD Espanyol footballers
A.D. Sanjoanense players
Lusitano G.C. players
America Football Club (RJ) players
Brazilian expatriate sportspeople in Spain
Brazilian expatriate sportspeople in Portugal
Expatriate footballers in Spain
Expatriate footballers in Portugal
Brazil international footballers
1954 FIFA World Cup players
Afro-Brazilian sportspeople